Nicholas Felton may refer to:

 Nicholas Felton (bishop) (1556–1626), English academic and bishop
 Nicholas Felton (graphic designer), infographic designer